Harlem Shakes were an American indie rock band from New York, formed in 2006 and signed to Gigantic Music. Prior to their signing, they released the 2007 EP Burning Birthdays. The band disbanded in September 2009 after a hiatus following the release of their first full-length album, Technicolor Health.

The group's guitarist, Todd Goldstein, is still actively producing music under the name ARMS. The group's drummer, Brent Katz, is also still actively involved in the indie music scene. Katz continues to produce music in his solo/side-project, Thunder & Lightning, which has released an album entitled  Kangaroo Court.

Discography

Studio albums
Technicolor Health (2009)

EPs
Burning Birthdays (2007)

References

External links
 Q+A with Lexy Benaim of The Harlem Shakes at ZapTown
 'Shakes broke up' - article at BrooklynVegan

Indie rock musical groups from New York (state)
Musical groups established in 2006
2006 establishments in New York City
Musical groups disestablished in 2009